The 2008 Nobel Prize in Literature was awarded to the French novelist Jean-Marie Gustave Le Clézio (born 1940), better known with his pen name J. M. G. Le Clézio, as an "author of new departures, poetic adventure and sensual ecstasy, explorer of a humanity beyond and below the reigning civilization." He became the 14th French-language author to receive the Nobel Prize for Literature after Claude Simon in 1985 and was followed later by Patrick Modiano in 2014.

Laureate

J. M. G. Le Clézio's literary career highlights different cultures in different times and challenges Western civilization's dominance. He questions modern society's materialistic superficiality, which chokes what is genuine in people's relationships with others, with nature, and with the past. Le Clézio, who writes in prose, has published over 40 works since his 1963 début with Le Procès-verbal ("The Interrogation", 1963). His major breakthrough came with Desert in 1980. With its flowing prose, the books stands in contrast to his earlier works' more experimental style. His other famous literary prose include Le Déluge ("The Flood", 1996), Le Chercheur d'or ("The Prospector", 1985), Onitsha (1991), and Étoile errante ("Wandering Star", 1992).

Nominees
According to the British betting agency Ladbrokes, the following perennial favorite authors were tipped to win the 2008 Nobel Prize in Literature: Italian scholar Claudio Magris, Israeli author Amos Oz, American prolific writer Joyce Carol Oates, American novelist Philip Roth, Japanese writer Haruki Murakami, Nigerian novelist Chinua Achebe, Syrian poet Adunis, Australian poet Les Murray, Canadian author Michael Ondaatje, and American sci-fi writer Ursula K. Leguin.

Nobel lecture
Le Clézio used his Nobel prize acceptance lecture to attack the subject of information poverty. The title of his lecture was Dans la forêt des paradoxes ("In the forest of paradoxes"), a title he attributed to Stig Dagerman.

Gallery
 9 October 2008: Announcement of the 2008 Nobel Prize laureate in Literature at the Swedish Academy by Horace Engdahl.

 6 December 2008: Jean-Marie Gustave Le Clézio entertaining questions during the Swedish Academy's press conference.

References

External links
Prize announcement 2008 nobelprize.org
Award Ceremony nobelprize.org
Award ceremony speech nobelprize.org

2008